is the capital city of Wakayama Prefecture in the Kansai region of Japan. , the city had an estimated population of 351,391 in 157066 households and a population density of 1700 persons per km².

Geography
Wakayama is located at the northwest corner of Wakayama Prefecture, bordered by Osaka Prefecture to the north and the Kii Channel and Kitan Strait to the west. It is located on the mouth of the Kinokawa River with the main urban center of the city on the river's left bank.

Neighboring municipalities
Wakayama Prefecture
Kainan
Kinokawa
Iwade
Osaka Prefecture
Hannan
Misaki
Hyōgo Prefecture
Sumoto, Hyōgo (separated by the Kitan Strait)

Climate
Wakayama has a Humid subtropical climate (Köppen Cfa) characterized by warm summers and cool winters with light to no snowfall.  The average annual temperature in Wakayama is 15.6 °C. The average annual rainfall is 1713 mm with September as the wettest month. The temperatures are highest on average in August, at around 26.4 °C, and lowest in January, at around 5.4 °C. The area is subject to typhoons in summer.

Demographics
Per Japanese census data, the population of Wakayama peaked in the 1980s and has been declining slowly since.

History
The area of the modern city of Wakayama was the center of ancient Kii Province, and the Iwase-Senzuka Kofun Cluster is one of the largest clusters of kofun burial mounds in Japan. The area the home of the Kii Kuni no miyatsuko,  a local king ruling the Kinokawa River Valley prior to the rise of the Yamato State. During the Nara period priests from Tang China built the Kimii-dera temple. From the Muromachi period, Waka-no-ura was a port on the Kinokawa River, and Toyotomi Hideyoshi constructed the predecessor of Wakayama Castle during his conquest of Kii Province during the Sengoku period. During the Edo period, the castle town at the base of Wakayama Castle grew and prospered under the rule of the Kii Tokugawa clan as the center of Kishū Domain. After the Meiji restoration,  Wakayama was granted city status on April 1, 1889 with the creation of the modern municipalities system. The city suffered 1208 deaths and 1560 critically wounded in the July 9, 1945 Bombing of Wakayama during World War II, which destroyed more than half of the urban area. On April 1, 1997, Wakayama attained core city status, with increased local autonomy.

Government
Wakayama has a mayor-council form of government with a directly elected mayor and a unicameral city council of 38 members. Wakayama contributes 15 members to the Wakayama Prefectural Assembly. In terms of national politics, the city is divided between Wakayama 1st district and Wakayama 2nd district of the lower house of the Diet of Japan.

Economy
Wakayama is the main commercial city of northern Wakayama and is the largest city in Wakayama Prefecture. Primary industries include agriculture, notably rice and citrus fruits, and commercial fishing. Secondary industries are centered around electronics and heavy industry. Nippon Steel remains a major employer, although the city suffered considerably when former Sumitomo Steel shifted much of its production to China. Other major employers include Kao Corporation and Mitsubishi Electric.

Education

Colleges and Universities
Wakayama University
Wakayama Medical University
Wakayama Shin-ai University
Wakayama College of Science Studies
Tokyo Health Care University School of Nursing
Takarazuka University of Medical and Health Care MedicalSchool

Primary and secondary education
Wakayama has 50 public elementary schools, 19 public middle schools and one public high school operated by the city government and one private elementary school and three private middle schools. The Wakayama Prefectural Board of Education operates two public middle schools and 10 public high schools. There are also four private high schools.In addition, there is one elementary school and one high school run by Wakayama University.

The prefecture also operates five special education school for the handicapped, and one more is operated by Wakayama University.

The city has one North Korean school, .

Transportation

Railway
 JR West – Hanwa Line
  -  -  - 
 JR West – Kisei Main Line
  -  -  -  - 
 JR West – Wakayama Line
 -  -  -  - 
 Wakayama Electric Railway Kishigawa Line
  -  -  -  -  -  -  -  -  - 
 Nankai Electric Railway Nankai Main Line
  -  - 
 Nankai Electric Railway Wakayamako Line
  -   
 Nankai Electric Railway Kada Line
  -  -  -  -  -  -  -  -

Highway
  Hanwa Expressway
  Keinawa Expressway

Sister cities
Wakayama has sister-city relationships with four overseas municipalities:

 Bakersfield, California, United States
 Jeju, Jeju Province, South Korea
 Richmond, British Columbia, Canada
 Jinan, Shandong, China
He married and runs his own clinic in China. In 1976, he visited Wakayama after nearly 40 years.

Local attractions
Wakayama Castle
Kimiidera
Hinokuma Shrine
Itakiso Shrine
Kamayama Shrine
Kishū Tōshō-gū
Wakayama Marina City 
The Museum of Modern Art, Wakayama
 Wakayama is home to one of Japan's three Melody Roads, which is made from grooves cut into the pavement, which when driven over causes a tactile vibration and audible rumbling transmitted through the wheels into the car body.

Wakayama Prefecture is famous across Japan for its umeboshi (salty pickled plums) and mikan (mandarins).

References

External links

 Wakayama City official website 
 Wakayama City official website 
 Wakayama City official Youtube channel
 Wakayama City Tourist Association 
 Waiker's Guide Map to Wakayama 
 

 
Cities in Wakayama Prefecture
Port settlements in Japan
Populated coastal places in Japan